"Two Dogs" was a lemon-based alcopop. 

Two Dogs may also refer to:

 Dan "Two Dogs" Hampton, a retired United States Air Force Lieutenant Colonel
 Two Dogs, a character in the John Brunner novel Times Without Number
 Two Dogs, a 1891 painting by Pierre Bonnard
 "Two Dogs, a song by Bob Geldof 
 "Two Dogs", a 1992 song by Chocolate USA from All Jets Are Gonna Fall Today
 "Two Dogs, a 2002 song by The Bruces from The War of the Bruces
 "Two Dogs", a 2020 song by Moses Sumney from Græ
 Two Dogs, a 2017 album by Popa Chubby